Minuscule 749 (in the Gregory-Aland numbering), Θε202 (von Soden), is a Greek minuscule manuscript of the New Testament written on parchment. Palaeographically it has been assigned to the 13th century. The manuscript has no complex contents. Scrivener labelled it as 773e.

Description 

The codex contains the text of the four Gospels on 199 parchment leaves (size ), with some lacunae. It lacks text of Matthew 1:1-3:10; 4:3-7:28; 12:1-24:26; 24:44-28:20; Mark 14:62-16:20; Luke 2:51-5:12; 5:26-11:51; 21:34-38; 22:28-34; John 1:15-5:45; 19:35-20:1; 21:19-fin.

The text is written in one column per page, 41-42 lines per page.

It contains Prolegomena and a commentary of Theophylact.

Text 

Aland the Greek text of the codex did not place in any Category.

It was not examined according to the Claremont Profile Method.

History 

F. H. A. Scrivener dated the manuscript to the 12th or 13th century and C. R. Gregory dated the manuscript to the 13th century. The manuscript is currently dated by the INTF to the 13th century.

It was added to the list of New Testament manuscripts by Scrivener (773) and Gregory (749). It was examined and described by Paulin Martin. Gregory saw the manuscript in 1885.

The manuscript is now housed at the Bibliothèque nationale de France (Suppl. Gr. 904) in Paris.

See also 

 List of New Testament minuscules
 Biblical manuscript
 Textual criticism
 Minuscule 748

References

Further reading 

 

Greek New Testament minuscules
13th-century biblical manuscripts
Bibliothèque nationale de France collections